The Freedom Day Cup is a football competition that takes place in Gozo.

The cup holders are S.K. Victoria Wanderers FC who won the cup after beating Sannat Lions in the 2009 final. This competition is just a final between two teams and it takes place on Freedom Day, that is March 31.
The first Freedom Day Cup took place in the season 1978–1979, that is the same year that Malta gained its freedom.

Format 
The first two teams in the table of the second round from the First Division compete for the Freedom Day Cup.

Cup Winners 
Here is a complete list of the past champions of the Freedom Day Cup.

2008-2009 Victoria Wanderers
2007-2008 Victoria Hotspurs
2006-2007 Nadur Youngsters
2005-2006 Ghajnsielem
2004-2005 Nadur Youngsters
2003-2004 Żebbuġ Rovers
2002-2003 Nadur Youngsters
2001-2002 Nadur Youngsters
2000-2001 Ghajnsielem
1999-2000 Żebbuġ Rovers
1998-1999 Xewkija Tigers
1997-1998 Sannat Lions
1996-1997 Xewkija Tigers
1995-1996 was not held
1994-1995 was not held
1993-1994 was not held
1992-1993 was not held
1991-1992 was not held
1990-1991 was not held
1989-1990 was not held
1988-1989 was not held
1987-1988 was not held
1986-1987 was not held
1985-1986 was not held
1984-1985 was not held
1983-1984 was not held
1982-1983 was not held
1981-1982 Sannat Lions
1980-1981 Sannat Lions
1979-1980 Sannat Lions
1978-1979 Sannat Lions

External links 
 Gozo FA

Football cup competitions in Malta
Football competitions in Gozo